Andrew York (born 1958) is an American Grammy Award winning classical guitarist and composer.

Biography 
York was born in 1958 in Atlanta, Georgia, United States, and grew up in Virginia. He received degrees from James Madison University in Virginia and the University of Southern California (USC). He studied in Spain, where he met classical guitarist John Williams. Williams has performed and recorded compositions by York. In 1989, York released his debut solo album, Perfect Sky (Timeless, 1989). He was a member of the Los Angeles Guitar Quartet until 2006.

York is the only alumnus in USC's history to have received their Distinguished Alumni Award twice, in 1997 as a member of the Los Angeles Guitar Quartet and again in 2003 for his solo music career.

He played lute with the USC Early Music Ensemble. In addition to his solo career, recording and performing his own compositions, York's recent collaborations include projects with Andy Summers, W. A. Mathieu, Dai Kimura, and Mitsuko Kado. York's tour schedule has included concerts in thirty countries. York's compositions and arrangements for guitar have been performed and recorded by guitarists John Williams, Christopher Parkening, Karin Schaupp and Sharon Isbin.

Accomplishments 
York has over 50 works published for guitar: solo, duo, trio, quartet, and ensemble. He has appeared in three DVDs, has recorded or appeared as soloist on more than ten albums, and has published a three-volume work on jazz for classical guitarists. York has played on ten recordings with the Los Angeles Guitar Quartet, including the Grammy Award-winning Guitar Heroes (2004). His solo albums include: Perfect Sky (1986), Dénouement (1994), Into Dark (1997), California Breeze (2006), Hauser Sessions (2007), Yamour (2012), Home (2018) and The Equations of Beauty (2018). He also released five band tracks, Lotus Eaters, Stratojee and Land Below Waves, in 2018, DissFunkShun and Pay the Piper, in 2019, and a number of singles in 2019 and 2020.

Andrew York is a member of the Triple Nine Society and his article Bowling Balls and Binary Switches was published in their journal Vidya in December 2016. He became a voting member at the Recording Academy in 2018.

Regarding Dénouement, Jim Ferguson stated that the five original suites that make up the recording "demonstrate [York's] exceptional compositional breadth, commanding instrumental abilities, and rich tone. Rife with folk, jazz, and ancient influences, the material ranges from challenging to simple yet highly musical."

Discography

Solo 
 Perfect Sky (1986)
 Dénouement (1994)
 Into Dark (1997)
 Hauser Sessions (2007)
 Yamour (2012)
 Home (2018)
 The Equations of Beauty (2018)

Singles 
 "Silent Night" (2019)
 "Undercurrents" (2020)
 "Deepening" (2020)
 "Dancing with Maya" (2020)
 "Not Alone" (2020)
 "Hall of Forgotten Rooms" (2020)
 "Night on Maui" (2020)
 "Numen" (2020)
 "Lumen" (2020)
 "Menhir" (2020)
 "Numina" (2020)
 "The World Has Changed" (2020)
 "Annie's Song" (2020)
 "Second Glass" (2020)
 "The Dancer" (2021)

Band tracks 
"Lotus Eaters" (2018)
"Stratojee" (2018)
"Land Below Waves" (2018)
"DissFunkShun" (2019)
"Pay the Piper" (2019)

With LAGQ 
 Guitar Recital
 Dances from Renaissance to Nutcracker
 Evening in Granada
 Labyrinth
 For Thy Pleasure
 The Best of LAGQ
 L.A.G.Q.
 Air and Ground
 LAGQ: Latin
 Guitar Heroes
 Spin

Collaborations and compilations 
 Windham Hill Records: Guitar Sampler (1988) 
 Legends of Guitar (Rhino, 1991) 
 An Evening with International Guitar Night with Guinga, Brian Gore, and Pierre Bensusan (Favored Nations, 2004)
 Centerpeace (2010) with guitarist Andy Summers, and pianists Mitsuko Kado and Allaudin Mathieu
 "In Dialogue" by Ulli Boegershausen (2019)
 "Push It" by Ulli Boegershausen (2020)

DVDs 
 Contemporary Classic Guitar
 LAGQ Live!
 Primal Twang

Books 
 Jazz for Classical Cats I: Harmony (method book w/CD)
 Jazz for Classical Cats II: Chord/Melody (method book w/CD)
 Jazz for Classical Cats III: Improvisation (method book w/CD)

References

External links
 Official website

20th-century classical composers
21st-century classical composers
American male classical composers
American classical composers
American classical guitarists
American male guitarists
James Madison University alumni
Living people
Composers for the classical guitar
USC Thornton School of Music alumni
1958 births
20th-century American guitarists
21st-century American guitarists
Windham Hill Records artists
Guitarists from Georgia (U.S. state)
Musicians from Atlanta
20th-century American composers
20th-century American male musicians
21st-century American male musicians